Zora or Zorah is a female given name.

People with the name

Given name
 Zora Andrich, American model and actress
 Zora Arkus-Duntov (1909–1996), American engineer
 Zora Kramer Brown (1949–2013), American breast cancer awareness advocate
 Zora Brziaková (born 1964), Slovak basketball player
 Zora G. Clevenger (1881–1970), American football, basketball, and baseball player
 Zora Cross (1890–1964), Australian poet and author
 Zora Dirnbach (1929–2019), Croatian writer
 Zora Fair (died 1865), American spy
 Zora Folley (1931–1972), American boxer
 Zora Howard, American actress and writer
 Zora Neale Hurston (1891–1960), American author, anthropologist, and filmmaker
 Zora Jandová (born 1958), Czech singer and actress
 Zora Jiráková, Czech actress
 Zora Kerova (born 1950), Czech actress
 Zora Kolínska (1941–2002), Slovak actress and singer
 Zora Kostková (born 1952), Czech actress
 Zora Singh Maan (born 1940), Indian politician
 Zora Martin-Felton, American museum director
 Zora Mintalová-Zubercová (born 1950), Slovakian ethnographer, historian and museologist
 Zora J. Murff (born 1987), American photographer
 Zora Palová (born 1947), Slovakian glass artist
 Zora Petrović (1894–1962), Serbian painter
 Zora Plešnar (1925–2021), Slovenian photographer
 Zora Rozsypalová (1922–2010), Czech actress
 Zora Šemberová (1913–2012), Czech dancer, educator and choreographer
 Zora Simčáková (born 1963), Slovak cross-country skier
 Zora Singh (1928–2005), Indian athlete
 Zora Tavčar (born 1928), Slovene writer, essayist and translator
 Zora Vesecká (born 1967), Czech actress
 Zora Wolfová (1928–2012), Czech translator
 Zora Young (born 1948), American singer

Fictional characters
 Princess Zora,, a character in The Legend of Zelda
 Zora (vampire), an Italian comic book erotic character
 Zora Crane, a character played by Patti LuPone in Frasier
 Zora Ideale, a character in Black Clover voiced by Hikaru Midorikawa and Johnny Yong Bosch
 Zora Lancaster, a character played by Allisyn Ashley Arm in Sonny With a Chance

Surname
 Anna Lacková-Zora (1899–1988), Slovak author
 Hanna Zora (1939–2016), Chaldean Catholic archbishop

See also
 Zora (disambiguation)
 Zoran, the masculine form of Zora
 Zorka, a given name
 Zorya, a figure in Slavic folklore
 Zhora Salome, a character in Blade Runner

External links 
Zora on Behind the Name

Feminine given names
Slavic feminine given names
Bosnian feminine given names
Czech feminine given names
Slovak feminine given names
Ukrainian feminine given names
Serbian feminine given names
Croatian feminine given names